The Hagemann Mansion is a town mansion located at Grønningen 11 in Copenhagen, Denmark. It now serves as the Finnish ambassador's residence in Copenhagen.

History
The mansion was built for the financier Paul Hagemann in 1918. The architect was Carl Brummer.

The Finnish state purchased the building from Hagemann  in 1943. One of Hagemann's sons, Jørgen Hagemann, had been a military volunteer on the Finnish side in the Winter War against the Soviet Union and again in the Continuation War where he was killed in action at Hangö in the summer of 1941.

Today
The building contains the official residence of the Finnish ambassador to Denmark. It also contains residences for other staff at the embassy, representative facilities and guest rooms. The Finnish embassy in Copenhagen is located at Sankt Annæ Plads.

References

External links
 Tendering in the Danish National Art Library

1918 establishments in Denmark
Carl Brummer buildings
Diplomatic residences in Copenhagen
Houses completed in 1918
Houses in Copenhagen